= Guddad Hulikatti =

Coordinates: 15°09′N 75°08′E

- Village
- Interactive map of Guddad Hulikatti
- Country: India
- State: Karnataka
- District: Dharwad

Population (2011)
  - Total: 1,518

Languages
  - Official: Kannada
- Time zone: UTC+5:30 (IST)

Guddad Hulikatti is a village in Dharwad district of Karnataka, India.

== Demographics ==
As of the 2011 Census of India there were 300 households in Guddad Hulikatti and a total population of 1,518 consisting of 810 males and 708 females. There were 206 children ages 0-6.
